Something's Rotten is a Canadian drama film, directed by Harvey Frost and released in 1979. The film stars Charlotte Blunt as the queen of an unnamed European country, who is being pressured by the Prime Minister (Cec Linder) to abdicate the throne in favour of one of her sons, but who must wrestle with the question of which son, the older but emotionally unstable Prince Calvin (Geoffrey Bowes) or the younger but more mature Prince George (Christopher Barry), will be named as her successor. Meanwhile, a series of murders of the palace staff is being committed by an unidentified "Skulker", whom the queen begins to suspect may in fact be one of the princes.

The film was shot at Casa Loma in Toronto.

The film was not well received by critics. The magazine Cinema Canada wrote that Bowes' performance as Prince Calvin was the only good thing about the film, while critic Jay Scott claimed that when the film screened at the 1979 Cannes Film Festival, by the time the screening ended there weren't enough people left in the theatre to boo or hiss it.

The film garnered two Genie Award nominations at the 1st Genie Awards in 1980, for Best Actor (Bowes) and Best Costume Design (Julie Whitfield).

References

External links 
 

1979 films
Canadian drama films
English-language Canadian films
Films set in Europe
Films about royalty
1970s English-language films
1970s Canadian films